Kiki Petrosino (born 1979) is an American poet and professor of poetry. She currently teaches at the University of Virginia in Charlottesville, Virginia.

Early life and education
Petrosino was born and raised in Baltimore, Maryland. After spending two years in Switzerland teaching Italian and English in a private school, she earned a Bachelor of Arts from the University of Virginia (2001), a Master of Arts in humanities degree from the University of Chicago (2004), and a Master of Fine Arts from the University of Iowa Writers' Workshop (2006).

Career 
Petrosino previously taught at the University of Louisville in Louisville, Kentucky, and Spalding University, also in Louisville.

Her collection of poetry Witch Wife was cited by the New York Times as one of the best works of poetry of 2017.  Her work has earned her fellowships such as the Al Smith Fellowship from the Kentucky Arts Council and the 2019 Fellowship in Creative Writing from the National Endowment for the Arts. Her prose has appeared in publications including Ploughshares, Poetry Magazine, Iowa Review, and more.

Reviewers have praised Petrosino's use of repetition and unconventional hyphenation in conjunction with traditional poetic forms such as the sestina. Petrosino has cited her familiarity with the Italian language and its comparative inflexibility as inspiration for her play with English.

Honors and awards 

 Rilke Prize, University of North Texas, 2021
 Creative Writing Fellowship, National Endowment for the Arts, 2019
 Al Smith Individual Artist Fellowship, Kentucky Arts Council, 2019
 Virginia Humanities Fellowship, Fall 2016
 Commonwealth Center for the Humanities and Society Faculty Fellowship, University of Louisville, 2016–17

Works
Petrosino has published four collections through Sarabande Books, with Black Genealogy being published by Brian Mill Press.
 Fort Red Border (2009)
 Hymn for the Black Terrific (2013)
 Witch Wife (2017)
 Black Genealogy (illustrations by Lauren Haldeman) (2017)
 White Blood: A Lyric of Virginia (2020)
Petrosino's poems have appeared in Best American Poetry and Tin House.

References

External links 
 Kiki Petrosino's personal site

1979 births
Living people
African-American poets
American women poets
Poets from Maryland
University of Virginia alumni
University of Virginia faculty
20th-century American women writers
Appalachian writers
American women academics
20th-century African-American women writers
20th-century African-American writers
21st-century African-American people
21st-century African-American women